The Sofia is a river of northwestern Madagascar. It flows through the Sofia Region. The source is at the Tsaratanana Massif at an altitude of 1784 metres.

Its mouth is in the Indian Ocean in the Boriziny-Vaovao District (Port-Bergé).

References

Rivers of Madagascar
Sofia Region